Vecumi Parish is an administrative unit of Balvi Municipality in the Latgale region of Latvia. Prior to 2009, it was part of the former Balvi District.

Towns, villages and settlements of Vecumi Parish 
  -parish administrative center

References 

Parishes of Latvia
Balvi Municipality
Latgale